The Barbados National Trust, founded in 1960, is an organisation which works to preserve and protect the natural and artistic heritage of Barbados and to increase public awareness of the country's historic and architectural treasures. These include a number of different cemeteries, gardens, historic houses, nature reserves, park areas, windmills and coastal areas. 

The Trust also runs museums displaying a collection of artefacts owned and made by Barbadians, as well as an education programme, focusing on the island's history and what it means to the future.

The Barbados National Trust has built a good working relationship with other National Trusts worldwide, equally with the organisations and their members, in places such as Canada, Scotland, England, Ireland, Wales, and the United States.

Published works

See also

Plantation Reserve
List of plantations in Barbados

External links
 , Barbados National Trust

1960 establishments in Barbados
Barbadian culture
Charities based in Barbados
National trusts
Nature conservation in Barbados
Organizations established in 1960
Tourism in Barbados